The National Association of Science Writers (NASW) was created in 1934 by a dozen science journalists and reporters in New York City.  The aim of the organization was to improve the craft of science journalism and to promote good science reportage.

In June 1934, John J. O'Neill, William L. Laurence, Howard W. Blakeslee, Gobind Behari Lal and David Dietz formed NASW as a press association with Dietz as its president. Several others joined the association. The NASW incorporated in 1955, pledging itself to "foster the dissemination of accurate information regarding science through all media normally devoted to informing the public".  Leaders of the NASW have been freelance and staff reporters for a majority of US newspapers, wire services, magazines, and broadcasters.

As of September 29, 2007, the organization reported having 2,549 members and claimed to be the largest organization of science writers in the world.

Each year since 1972 the organization holds the Science in Society Awards to "provide recognition — without subsidy from any professional or commercial interest — for investigative or interpretive reporting about the sciences and their impact on society."  The organization considers granting awards in four categories: books, commentary and opinion, science reporting, and science reporting with a local or regional focus.

See also
 Board of Editors in the Life Sciences (BELS)
 Council for the Advancement of Science Writing
 The Open Notebook

References

External links
The National Association of Science Writers

Science writing organizations
Organizations established in 1934
1934 establishments in New York City